Eka Sephashvili (born 1 July 1973) is a Georgian politician. Since 2020, she has been a member of the Parliament of Georgia of the 10th convocation by party list, election bloc Georgian Dream - Democratic Georgia. On 2 August 2022, Sephashvili left the Georgian Dream party and joined the People's Power party.

References

21st-century women politicians from Georgia (country)
1973 births
Living people

21st-century politicians from Georgia (country)
Social democrats from Georgia (country)